The Statute of Westminster may refer to:

 Statute of Westminster 1275, often called the Statute of Westminster I, codified existing law in England in 51 chapters
 Statute of Westminster 1285, often called the Statute of Westminster II, contained the clause De donis conditionalibus
 Quia Emptores of 1290, often called the Statute of Westminster III, prevented tenants from alienating their lands to others by subinfeudation
 Statute of Westminster 1327, first mentioned the military post of Conductor
 Statute of Westminster 1472, mostly noted for requiring ships coming to an English port to bring a tax in bowstaves
 Statute of Westminster 1931, established legislative equality for the self-governing dominions of the British Empire with the United Kingdom

See also
 Statute of Westminster Adoption Act (disambiguation)